Mount Schwerdtfeger is a mountain in the Royal Society Range, Antarctica; it is named after Werner Schwerdtfeger, senior meteorological researcher, University of Wisconsin–Madison, a driving force in the study of Antarctic meteorology. His specialty was the study of the barrier winds east of the Antarctic Peninsula.

Mountains of Victoria Land
Scott Coast